Fat Pat may refer to:
Fat Pat (rapper) (1970–1998), American rapper
Pat Butcher or Fat Pat, a character in EastEnders
Pat or Fat Pat, a Little Britain character in Fat Fighters
 Pat Musitano, member of the Musitano crime family